Mount Hunt is a dome-shaped mountain about  high, surmounting the promontory which terminates in Cape De la Motte, Antarctica. It was discovered by the Australasian Antarctic Expedition (1911–14) under Douglas Mawson, who named it for H.A. Hunt, Director of the Commonwealth Bureau of Meteorology.

References

Mountains of George V Land